A railroad plough is a rail vehicle which supports an immensely strong, hook-shaped plough. It is used for destruction of sleepers in warfare, as part of a scorched earth policy, so that the track becomes unusable for the enemy.

In use, the plough is lowered to rip up the middle of the track as it is hauled along by a locomotive. This action breaks the wooden ties (sleepers) which forces the steel rails out of alignment, making the line impassable by later rail vehicles. Bridges and signalling equipment also suffer serious damage.

Deployment

A similar device, which ripped the rail off the ties, had been used by railway troops of the Imperial Russian Army in World War I, during their retreat from Galicia and Poland. Railroad ploughs were in use by the Czechoslovak Army during the German occupation in 1938, and by German Wehrmacht armed forces retreating northward through Italy and westward from the Eastern Front in World War II. 

The German author Arno Schmidt (1914–1979) in his post-war novel Leviathan uses the image of a railroad plough as a symbol of evil.

Surviving vehicles

See also
 Sherman's neckties –  A railway destruction tactic used in the American Civil War by the Union to prevent the Confederacy from using the tracks by making them difficult to repair.
 Nero Decree – Hitler's unfulfilled plan to destroy German infrastructure, during retreat, to avoid it being used by the Allied forces

References

External links

Schwellenpflug, the rail wolf used by Germans in retreat.
Photos of "rail wolf" in action and resultant damage
Video of German soldiers using a rail plough.
 Andrew Grantham's blog

Military railway equipment
Area denial weapons
Ploughs
Railway weapons